"21st Century Supersister" is a song by the British rock singer Toyah Willcox, released in 2011.

Background
The song was originally written by Toyah and her collaborator Simon Darlow for the 2008 album In the Court of the Crimson Queen, but did not make the final tracklist. It was subsequently re-worked with new lyrics and featured in the 2011 film The Power of Three, in which Willcox starred. The original version was included as the B-side of the digital single and was added to the album for its 2013 reissue.

"21st Century Supersister" and its parent album In the Court of the Crimson Queen are both references to King Crimson, the band formed by Willcox's husband Robert Fripp. King Crimson's most well-known track "21st Century Schizoid Man" appeared on the band's debut album, In the Court of the Crimson King.

Track listing
 Digital single
 "21st Century Supersister" – 3:40
 "21st Century Supersister" (Original Demo) – 3:36

Personnel
 Toyah Willcox – vocals
 Simon Darlow – all instruments, backing vocals, producing, mixing

References

External links
 Official audio stream at YouTube
 The official Toyah website

2008 songs
2011 singles
Toyah Willcox songs
Songs written by Toyah Willcox
Songs written by Simon Darlow